AI2 may refer to:

 Adventure Island II
 Allen Institute for AI
 App Inventor 2